John Coda is an American composer with a focus on film music and television scoring.

Life
Coda was born in Los Angeles and began composing music when he was still in his teens. He learned to play the drums, piano and flute. After earning his Bachelor of Music degree in composition at California State University, Northridge, he worked for various recording studios in Hollywood, dedicating himself to film and television scoring.
Today, Coda lives in Santa Monica, Southern California.

Film selections 
 1994: Red Sun Rising
 1994–1995: The Secret World of Alex Mack (TV series)
 1995: The Disappearance of Kevin Johnson
 1996: Sworn to Justice
 1998: By Default (short)
 1998: 3 Ninjas: High Noon at Mega Mountain
 1999: Wild Grizzly (TV film)
 1999: P.U.N.K.S.
 1999: Treehouse Hostage
 2000: Mom & Me (short)
 2000: Primary Suspect
 2000: The Trial of Old Drum (TV film)
 2000: Just Sue Me
 2001: Race to Space
 2002: Girl Fever
 2000–2003: Even Stevens (TV series)
 2003: Monster Man
 2004: Let's Love Hate (short)
 2003–2007: That's So Raven (TV series)
 2006: The Cutting Edge: Going for the Gold
 2006: Beyond the Break (TV series)
 2006: Just for Kicks (TV series)
 2007: If I Had Known I Was a Genius
 2007: Bratz
 2009: Legally Blondes
 2012: Chilly Christmas
 2013: Baby Geniuses and the Mystery of the Crown Jewels
 2013: A Sierra Nevada Gunfight
 2013: Robosapien: Rebooted
 2014: Baby Geniuses and the Treasures of Egypt
 2015: Hoovey
 2015: Baby Geniuses and the Space Baby
 2015: Just in Time for Christmas
 2022: The King's Daughter

References

External links 
 
 

American film score composers
American male film score composers
American music arrangers
American television composers
Living people
Male television composers
Musicians from Los Angeles
Year of birth missing (living people)